Mussaenda is a genus of flowering plants in the family Rubiaceae. They are native to the African and Asian tropics and subtropics. Several species are cultivated as ornamental plants.

Species
Mussaenda includes the following species:
 Mussaenda acuminata Blume (1826)
 Mussaenda acuminatissima Merr. (1920 publ. 1921)
 Mussaenda aestuarii K.Schum. (1905)
 Mussaenda afzelii G.Don (1834)
 Mussaenda afzelioides Wernham (1913)
 Mussaenda albiflora Merr., Philipp. J. Sci. (1910)
 Mussaenda angolensis Wernham (1913)
 Mussaenda angustisepala Ridl. (1923)
 Mussaenda anisophylla Vidal (1885)
 Mussaenda antiloga Chun & W.C.Ko (1974)
 Mussaenda aptera Pit. (1923)
 Mussaenda arcuata Poir. (1797)
 Mussaenda attenuifolia Elmer (1913)
 Mussaenda bammleri Valeton (1925)
 Mussaenda benguetensis Elmer (1906)
 Mussaenda bevanii F.Muell. (Nov. 1887)
 Mussaenda bityensis Wernham (1919)
 Mussaenda bodenii Wernham, Trans. Linn. Soc. London (1916)

 Mussaenda bonii Pit. (1923)
 Mussaenda borbonica Lapeyrere (1888)
 Mussaenda brachygyna Merr. & L.M.Perry (1944)
 Mussaenda breviloba S.Moore (1905)
 Mussaenda cambodiana Pierre ex Pit. (1923)
 Mussaenda caudatiloba D.Fang (2002)
 Mussaenda celebica Ridl. (1940)
 Mussaenda chevalieri Pit. (1923)
 Mussaenda chinensis Lour. (1790)
 Mussaenda chingii C.Y.Wu ex H.H.Hsue & H.Wu (1986)
 Mussaenda chippii Wernham (1913)
 Mussaenda chlorantha Merr., Philipp. J. Sci. (1913)
 Mussaenda chrysotricha Valeton (1925)
 Mussaenda conopharyngiifolia Stapf, J. Linn. Soc. (1905)
 Mussaenda cordifolia Wall. ex G.Don (1834)
 Mussaenda corymbosa Roxb. (1824)
 Mussaenda cuspidata Geddes (1927)
 Mussaenda cylindrocarpa Burck (1883)
 Mussaenda dasyphylla Miq. (1869)
 Mussaenda dawei Hutch. (1922)
 Mussaenda debeauxii Wernham (1916)
 Mussaenda decipiens H.Li (1980)
 Mussaenda densiflora H.L.Li (1943)
 Mussaenda dinhensis Pierre ex Pit. (1923)
 Mussaenda divaricata Hutch. (1916)
 Mussaenda dolichocarpa (Lauterb. & K.Schum.) Rech., Denkschr. Kaiserl. Akad. Wiss. (1913)
 Mussaenda dranensis Wernham (1921)
 Mussaenda elegans Schumach. & Thonn. (1827)
 Mussaenda elliptica Hutch. (1916)
 Mussaenda elmeri Merr. (1929)
 Mussaenda emeiensis Z.Y.Zhu & S.J.Zhu, Bull. Bot. Res. (2008)
 Mussaenda epiphytica Cheek (2009)
 Mussaenda erosa Champ. ex Benth. (1852)
 Mussaenda erythrophylla Schumach. & Thonn. (1827)
 Mussaenda ferrea Geddes (1927)
 Mussaenda ferruginea K.Schum. (1889)
 Mussaenda fissibractea Merr. (1937)
 Mussaenda forbesii Wernham ex S.Moore (1923)
 Mussaenda forsteniana Miq. (1869)
 Mussaenda frondosa L. (1753)
 Mussaenda garrettii Craib (1931)
 Mussaenda glabra Vahl (1794)
 Mussaenda glabrata (Hook.f.) Hutch. ex Gamble (1921)
 Mussaenda gossweileri Wernham (1916)
 Mussaenda grandiflora Benth. (1849)
 Mussaenda grandifolia Elmer (1906)
 Mussaenda griffithii Wight ex Hook.f. (1880)
 Mussaenda hainanensis Merr. (1935)
 Mussaenda havilandii ined..
 Mussaenda heinsioides Hiern (1877)
 Mussaenda herderscheeana Valeton (1925)
 Mussaenda hilaris Pierre ex Pit. (1923)
 Mussaenda hirsuta Ridl. (1923)
 Mussaenda hirsutissima (Hook.f.) Hutch. ex Gamble (1921)
 Mussaenda hirsutula Miq. (1861)
 Mussaenda hoaensis Pierre ex Pit. (1923)
 Mussaenda hossei Craib ex Hosseus, Beih. Bot. Centralbl. 28(2): 444, 457 (1911)
 Mussaenda incana Wall. (1824)
 Mussaenda intuspilosa Jayaw. (1963)
 Mussaenda isertiana DC. (1830)
 Mussaenda johannis-winkleri Merr. (1937)
 Mussaenda kajewskii Merr. & L.M.Perry (1944)
 Mussaenda kanehirae Merr. & L.M.Perry (1944)
 Mussaenda keenanii Hook.f. (1880)
 Mussaenda kerrii Craib (1911)
 Mussaenda kingdon-wardii Jayaw. (1965)
 Mussaenda kintaensis King ex Stapf, Trans. Linn. Soc. London (1894)
 Mussaenda kwangsiensis H.L.Li (1943)
 Mussaenda kwangtungensis H.L.Li (1944)
 Mussaenda lanata C.B.Rob., Philipp. J. Sci. (1911)
 Mussaenda lancifolia K.Krause (1920)
 Mussaenda lancipetala X.F.Deng & D.X.Zhang (2008)
 Mussaenda landolphioides Wernham (1913)
 Mussaenda lanuginosa Ridl. (1940)
 Mussaenda laxa (Hook.f.) Hutch. ex Gamble (1921)
 Mussaenda laxiflora Hutch. (1916)
 Mussaenda leptantha Wernham (1919)
 Mussaenda leucophylla E.M.A.Petit (1955)
 Mussaenda leucova Gilli (1979 publ. 1980)
 Mussaenda linderi Hutch. & Dalziel (1931)
 Mussaenda lobbii (Ridl.) ined..
 Mussaenda longipetala H.L.Li (1943)
 Mussaenda longisepala Geddes (1927)
 Mussaenda longituba Valeton (1907)
 Mussaenda lotungensis Chun & W.C.Ko (1974)
 Mussaenda macrantha Valeton (1911)
 Mussaenda macrophylla Wall. (1824)
 Mussaenda macrophylla f. grandisepala Jayaw. (1963)
 Mussaenda magallanensis Elmer (1911)
 Mussaenda maingayi (Hook.f.) Hemsl. ex B.D.Jacks., Index Kew. (1896)
 Mussaenda malaccensis Ridl. (1923)
 Mussaenda malacotricha Merr. & L.M.Perry (1944)
 Mussaenda membranacea King, J. Asiat. Soc. Bengal, Pt. 2 (1903)
 Mussaenda membranifolia Merr. (1923)
 Mussaenda microdonta Wernham (1913)
 Mussaenda milleri Elmer (1939)
 Mussaenda mollis Geddes (1927)
 Mussaenda mollissima C.Y.Wu ex H.H.Hsue & H.Wu (1986)
 Mussaenda monticola K.Krause (1912)
 Mussaenda motleyi Ridl. (1940)
 Mussaenda multibracteata Merr., Philipp. J. Sci. (1916)
 Mussaenda multinervis C.Y.Wu ex H.H.Hsue & H.Wu (1986)
 Mussaenda nannanii Wernham (1918)
 Mussaenda nervosa Elmer (1911)
 Mussaenda nicobarica Shimpale, S.R.Yadav & Babu (2009)
 Mussaenda nijensis R.D.Good (1926)
 Mussaenda nivea A.Chev. ex Hutch. & Dalziel (1931)
 Mussaenda oblonga King, J. Asiat. Soc. Bengal, Pt. 2 (1903)
 Mussaenda oreadum Wernham, Trans. Linn. Soc. London (1916)
 Mussaenda ornata S.Moore (1927)
 Mussaenda ovata Merr. & L.M.Perry (1944)
 Mussaenda palawanensis Merr., Philipp. J. Sci. (1915)
 Mussaenda paludosa E.M.A.Petit (1955)
 Mussaenda parryorum C.E.C.Fisch. (1928)
 Mussaenda parviflora Miq. (1867)
 Mussaenda parvifolia Valeton (1907)
 Mussaenda philippica A.Rich. (1830)
 Mussaenda philippinensis Merr., Philipp. J. Sci. (1908)
 Mussaenda pilosissima Valeton (1925)
 Mussaenda pinatubensis Elmer (1934)
 Mussaenda pingbianensis C.Y.Wu ex H.H.Hsue & H.Wu (1986)
 Mussaenda pluviatilis S.Moore (1927)
 Mussaenda polita Hiern (1877)
 Mussaenda polyneura King, J. Asiat. Soc. Bengal, Pt. 2 (1903)
 Mussaenda procera F.M.Bailey (1900)
 Mussaenda pubescens Dryand. (1810)
 Mussaenda pullei Valeton (1911)
 Mussaenda purpurascens Ridl. (1912)
 Mussaenda raiateensis J.W.Moore (1933)
 Mussaenda reinwardtiana Miq. (1857)
 Mussaenda ridleyana Wernham, Trans. Linn. Soc. London (1916)
 Mussaenda rivularis Welw. ex Hiern (1898)
 Mussaenda roxburghii Hook.f. (1880)
 Mussaenda rufa A.Rich. (1830)
 Mussaenda rufescens Valeton (1911)
 Mussaenda rufinervia Miq. (1857)
 Mussaenda saigonensis Pierre ex Pit. (1923)
 Mussaenda samana Jayaw. (1963)
 Mussaenda sandakana Govaerts (2008)
 Mussaenda sanderiana Ridl. (1909)
 Mussaenda scandens Elmer (1911)
 Mussaenda scratchleyi Wernham (1918)
 Mussaenda sericea Blume (1826)
 Mussaenda sessilifolia Hutch. (1916)
 Mussaenda setosa Merr., Philipp. J. Sci. (1915)
 Mussaenda shikokiana Makino (1904)
 Mussaenda simpliciloba Hand.-Mazz., Anz. Akad. Wiss. Wien (1925)
 Mussaenda soyauxii Büttner (1889)
 Mussaenda spectabilis Ridl. (1918)
 Mussaenda squiresii Merr. (1938)
 Mussaenda subsessilis Pierre ex Pit. (1923)
 Mussaenda sutepensis Hosseus (1911)
 Mussaenda tenuiflora Benth. (1849)
 Mussaenda teysmanniana Miq. (1857)
 Mussaenda theifera Pierre ex Carr. (1883)
 Mussaenda thorelii Pit. (1923)
 Mussaenda tomentosa Wall. ex G.Don (1834)
 Mussaenda treutleri Stapf (1909)
 Mussaenda tristigmatica Cummins (1898)
 Mussaenda ustii Alejandro (2008)
 Mussaenda utakwae Wernham, Trans. Linn. Soc. London (1916)
 Mussaenda variolosa Wall. ex G.Don (1834)
 Mussaenda vidalii Elmer (1911)
 Mussaenda villosa Wall. ex G.Don (1834)
 Mussaenda viridiflora Alejandro (2008)
 Mussaenda wallichii G.Don (1834)
 Mussaenda whitei S.Moore (1922)
 Mussaenda wrayi King, J. Asiat. Soc. Bengal, Pt. 2 (1903)
 Mussaenda zenkeri Wernham (1913)
 Mussaenda zollingeriana Klotzsch (1853)

Gallery

References

External links 
 Genus: Mussaenda , iziko museum
 Mussaenda in the World Checklist of Rubiaceae
 
 
 

 
Rubiaceae genera